Fulci is an Italian surname. Notable people with the surname include:

 Ludovico Fulci (1850–1934), Italian lawyer and professor
 Lucio Fulci (1927–1996), Italian film director
 Francesco Paolo Fulci (born 1931), Italian diplomat

Italian-language surnames